Clarissa Minnie Thompson Allen (October 1, 1859 – November 23, 1941) was an American educator and author. She wrote fictional stories about wealthy African-American families in the American South.

Personal life

Clarissa Minnie Thompson was born in Columbia, South Carolina, one of nine children of Eliza Henrietta Montgomery, a socialite, and Samuel Benjamin Thompson, a delegate in the South Carolina Constitutional Convention. She attended Howard Junior High School and a normal school in South Carolina. She worked at three different schools, including Allen University, where she taught subjects like algebra, Latin, physical geology, and history. She moved to Jefferson, Texas, around 1886, where she taught at a public school. She also lived in Ft. Worth, Texas, and worked in the public school system.

Career

Allen wrote fiction based around true stories about wealthy African-American families in the Southern United States. Her most notable work was Treading the Winepress, also called A Mountain of Misfortune. The book consisted of 41 stories about two families. The stories took place in "Capitolia," which was based on Columbia, South Carolina. The book includes love triangles and murder, as well as themes of womanhood, charity, and madness. It was a serialized publication and believed to be the first novel by an African-American woman from South Carolina. She also wrote novelettes for Texas-based publications. Her poetry was also published in African American newspapers. Some reviewers believed that her work was anti-religious, specifically towards the African Methodist Episcopal Church.

Further reading

Shockley, Ann Allen. "Clarissa Minnie Thompson." Afro-American Women Writers. 1746–1933: An Anthology and Critical Guide. Boston: G.K. Hall (1988).
Wallace-Sanders, Kimberly. "Clarissa Minnie Thompson." Oxford Companion to African American Literature. New York: Oxford University Press (1997).

References

1859 births
1941 deaths
Writers from Columbia, South Carolina
19th-century American women writers
African-American poets
American women poets
American women novelists
19th-century American educators
African-American educators
People from Fort Worth, Texas
19th-century American novelists
19th-century American poets
African-American women writers
Allen University faculty
Novelists from South Carolina
19th-century American women educators
American women academics
African-American novelists
20th-century African-American people
20th-century African-American women